The Fremantle Mariners is an Australian club water polo team that competes in the Australian National Water Polo League.  They are a men's team and are based in Fremantle.

References

External links

Water polo clubs in Australia
Fremantle
Sporting clubs in Perth, Western Australia